Abbeylara is a village in the easternmost portion of County Longford, Ireland, located about three kilometers east of Granard on the R396 regional road.  Its name is derived from a monastery, the great Abbey of Lerha, founded in 1205 by Hiberno-Norman magnate, Risteárd de Tiúit, for Cistercian monks.  The monastery was dissolved in 1539, although its ruins are still apparent on approach to the village. An ancient earthwork, the Duncla (Irish Dún-chlaí meaning "fortified ditch") or Black Pig's Dyke, which runs south-eastwards from Lough Gowna to Lough Kinale, goes through the larger parish of Abbeylara, and passes about one kilometre north of the village.

Because of its proximity to Lough Kinale and Lough Derragh, with a plentiful supply of trout, tench, bream and pike, Abbeylara attracts anglers and local angling clubs hold regular competitions.

Abbeylara GFC are the local Gaelic football club.

On 20 April 2000, the Gardaí (police) shot dead local man John Carthy in a siege at his home.

See also
 List of towns and villages in Ireland
 Barr Tribunal - Inquiry into the John Carthy siege and shooting of 2000

References

External links
 Abbeylara on Longford County Council website (archived)

Towns and villages in County Longford